Estonia competed at the 2007 World Championships in Athletics.

Medalists

Participants

References
Eesti 2007. a suurvõistlustel esinenud kergejõustiklased 

Nations at the 2007 World Championships in Athletics
World Championships in Athletics
2007